Visual MIMO is an optical communication system. The name is derived from MIMO, where the multiple transmitter multiple receiver model has been adopted for light in the visible and non-visible spectrum. In Visual MIMO, a LED or electronic visual display serves as the transmitter, while a camera serves as the receiver.

References

http://ieeexplore.ieee.org/xpls/abs_all.jsp?arnumber=5981735
http://winlab.rutgers.edu/~aashok/visualmimo/Home.html
http://winlab.rutgers.edu/~aashok/papers/wyuan_wacv2012.pdf
http://winlab.rutgers.edu/~aashok/papers/wyuan_procams11.pdf

Optical communications
Telecommunications
Light